The Red River of New Mexico, United States, is a short, perennial river that flows down the north slope of Mount Wheeler in the Sangre de Cristo Mountains, flows west past the towns of Red River and Questa and then south into the Rio Grande just south of the La Junta Campground.
The Red River is Taos's winter fishery with prime time being from October through early April. The Red provides visitors the unique opportunity to fish and ski on the same trip. A myriad of springs flow into the river greatly increasing the flows and keeping the water temperatures in the optimum trout fishing range of between 45 and 60 degrees making the Red an ideal winter trout fishery.

As the summer monsoon season comes to an end and afternoon showers begin to taper off, the river settles down and clears nicely, allowing the fun to begin.

In the fall, towards the middle to end of October, larger rainbow trout begin staging in the lower reaches of the river near the confluence with the Rio Grande and start pushing up the river to spawn, creating a great opportunity for a shot at some big Browns through November as they migrate up river and back again. The Red River is noted for its trout fishery and its lower portion is part of the Wild Rivers Recreation Area. Located below Questa on the river is the New Mexico Red River Fish Hatchery.

The Red River derives its water from snowmelt and summer season convective storms and due to the relatively consistent patterns of orographic precipitation it is a perennial stream.

See also
 Red River Canyon affair – a battle in the Taos Revolt, part of the Mexican–American War
 List of rivers of New Mexico
 List of tributaries of the Rio Grande
 Wild Rivers Recreation Area

References

Carson National Forest
Rivers of New Mexico
Rivers of Taos County, New Mexico
Tributaries of the Rio Grande
Wild and Scenic Rivers of the United States